SAHA syndrome, is a medical syndrome characterized by seborrhoea, acne, hirsutism and alopecia, and was first described in 1982. It is frequently associated with polycystic ovary syndrome, cystic mastitis, obesity, and infertility.

See also
 Hyperandrogenism
 HAIR-AN syndrome
 List of cutaneous conditions

References

Endocrine-related cutaneous conditions
Syndromes